The 2009–10 Wessex Football League was the 24th season of the Wessex Football League. The league champions for the second time in succession were Poole Town, who were again denied promotion to the Southern League due to ground grading problems. Wimborne Town were promoted as runners-up. There was the usual programme of promotion and relegation between the two Wessex League divisions.

For sponsorship reasons, the league was known as the Sydenhams Wessex League.

League tables

Premier Division
The Premier Division consisted of 22 clubs, the same as the previous season, after VT were promoted to the Southern League, and Hamble A.S.S.C. and Horndean were relegated to Division One. Three new clubs joined:
Blackfield & Langley, runners-up in Division One.
Totton & Eling, champions of Division One.
Winchester City, relegated from the Southern League.

Division One
Division One consisted of 21 clubs, the same as the previous season, after Totton & Eling and Blackfield & Langley were promoted to the Premier Division, and two clubs were relegated from the Premier Division:
Hamble A.S.S.C.
Horndean

References

Wessex Football League seasons
9